The 9th ceremony of the Premios Feroz, known as the Feroz Awards 2022, presented by the Asociación de Informadores Cinematográficos de España, took place at the Auditorio de Zaragoza in Zaragoza, Spain, on 29 January 2022, to recognize the best in Spanish cinema and television. The ceremony was hosted by director Nacho Vigalondo and comedian Paula Púa, and was broadcast on YouTube.

The nominations were announced on 25 November 2021 by actors Elena Rivera and Brays Efe.

Winners and nominees
The nominations for most of the categories were announced on 25 November 2021, with The Good Boss leading the nominations with nine, followed by Maixabel and Parallel Mothers with eight each. The nominations for the Feroz Arrebato awards for fiction and non-fiction were announced on December 21, 2021. A list of winners and nominees is presented as follows:

Film

Series

Multiple nominations and wins

Film

Series

See also
 36th Goya Awards

References

External links
 Official website

Feroz
January 2022 events in Spain
Zaragoza
21st century in Aragon